The Guy Home Economics Building is a historic school building on the campus of the Guy-Perkins School District, east of Guy, Arkansas.  It is a single story stone structure, with a gabled roof that features exposed rafter ends and large Craftsman brackets at the gable ends.  A single-story gabled porch, with an arched opening, shelters the main entrance.  It was built in 1936 with funding support from the Works Progress Administration.

The building was listed on the National Register of Historic Places in 1992.

See also
Guy High School Gymnasium
National Register of Historic Places listings in Faulkner County, Arkansas

References

School buildings on the National Register of Historic Places in Arkansas
1936 establishments in Arkansas
National Register of Historic Places in Faulkner County, Arkansas
Education in Faulkner County, Arkansas
School buildings completed in 1936
Works Progress Administration in Arkansas
Bungalow architecture in Arkansas
American Craftsman architecture in Arkansas
Home economics education